Staroye Baryatino is a rural locality (a selo) in Kazadayevsky Selsoviet, Sterlitamaksky District, Bashkortostan, Russia. The population was 33 as of 2010. There are 2 streets.

Geography 
Staroye Baryatino is located 12 km north of Sterlitamak (the district's administrative centre) by road. Vostochny is the nearest rural locality.

References 

Rural localities in Sterlitamaksky District